Ankh is a 2005 graphic adventure game developed by the German company Deck13 and published by bhv Software. It features a three-dimensional environment with cinematic camera movement. Humor is an important aspect of the game, and the influence of classic LucasArts adventure games is noticeable.

Ankh is a remake of Ankh: The Tales of Mystery, a 1998 adventure game developed by Artex Software for the Acorn Archimedes.

Ankh spawned two sequels: Ankh: Heart of Osiris and Ankh: Battle of the Gods. In 2006, the original Ankh was ported to Linux and OS X. A Special Edition of the game was released in the UK in February 2007. A Nintendo DS port was released in 2008 under the title Ankh: Curse of the Scarab King.

Plot 

The player takes the role of Assil, the son of a respected architect in Cairo. Assil is a party animal but at some point one of his party-nights turned out sour. When he tries to have some fun in the pyramids with two friends of his, he accidentally breaks some urns and thus disturbs the mummy resting in the pyramid. The mummy punishes Assil by placing a death curse on him, and now he has 24 hours to remove the curse and save himself. Later in the game Assil meets the Arabian ambassador's daughter Thara, who is also a playable character.

Jan Klose, Creative Director at Deck13 Interactive, also cited Monkey Island to be an influence for the Ankh series.

Development
The soundtrack for the game was composed by Dynamedion and was rated as 1st place for “Best German Soundtrack 2005”. According to GameStar, Ankh was produced on a small budget "in the low six-digit range".

Reception

Domestic

Ankh was a commercial hit in the German market, with sales of 100,000 units in that region alone. The Kölner Stadt-Anzeiger reported that it also saw success worldwide. According to Deck13, the combined global sales of Ankh and its first two sequels—Heart of Osiris and Battle of the Gods—surpassed 500,000 units by August 2009.

International

The PC and DS versions received "mixed or average reviews" according to the review aggregation website Metacritic.

References

External links

2005 video games
Adventure games
Deck13 games
Linux games
MacOS games
Nintendo DS games
Point-and-click adventure games
RuneSoft games
Video game remakes
Video games based on Egyptian mythology
Video games developed in Germany
Video games set in Egypt
Windows games